Louis Possner (August 11, 1917 – March 8, 1990) was a Jewish American basketball player.  Possner was an All-American center/forward at DePaul University.  Following the close of his college career, Possner played parts of two seasons with the United States' National Basketball League (NBL), a league that in 1948 would merge with the Basketball Association of America to create the National Basketball Association. Possner played for the NBL's Chicago Bruins and Syracuse Nationals, averaging 2.0 points per game for his NBL career.  Possner, also played in the competing American Basketball League, for the Philadelphia Sphas and Paterson Crescents.

References

External links
NBL stats

1917 births
1990 deaths
All-American college men's basketball players
American men's basketball players
Centers (basketball)
Chicago Bruins players
DePaul Blue Demons men's basketball players
Forwards (basketball)
Paterson Crescents players
Philadelphia Sphas players
Sportspeople from Chicago
Syracuse Nationals players
20th-century American Jews